The Bridge Theatre is a commercial theatre near Tower Bridge in London that opened in October 2017. It was developed by Nick Starr and Nicholas Hytner as the home of the London Theatre Company, which they founded following their tenancy as executive director and artistic director, respectively, at the National Theatre.

Format
The theatre seats 900 and is a flexible space to accommodate each production. For example, the opening production, Young Marx, featured a traditional proscenium arrangement, Julius Caesar had the stalls seating removed to be in promenade and allow the audience to be part of the mob within the play, and Nightfall was performed on a thrust stage. It was reported that the theatre cost £12 million to build.

All productions 
 Young Marx by Richard Bean and Clive Coleman, starring Rory Kinnear and Oliver Chris, directed by Nicholas Hytner (18 October–31 December 2017)
 Julius Caesar by William Shakespeare, starring Michelle Fairley, Ben Whishaw, David Calder and David Morrissey, directed by Nicholas Hytner (20 January–15 April 2018)
 Nightfall by Barney Norris, starring Ophelia Lovibond, Ukweli Roach, Clare Skinner and Sion Daniel Young, directed by Laurie Sansom (28 April–3 June 2018)
 My Name is Lucy Barton by Elizabeth Strout, adapted by Rona Munro, starring Laura Linney, directed by Richard Eyre (2–23 June 2018 and 23 January–16 February 2019)
 Allelujah! by Alan Bennett, directed by Nicholas Hytner (11 July–28 September 2018)
 A Very Very Very Dark Matter by Martin McDonagh, starring Jim Broadbent, directed by Matthew Dunster (10 October–29 December 2018)
 Alys, Always a new play by Lucinda Coxon based on the novel by Harriet Lane, starring Joanne Froggatt and Robert Glenister, directed by Nicholas Hytner (25 February–30 March 2019)
 A German Life – a new play by Christopher Hampton, drawn from the life and testimony of Brunhilde Pomsel, starring Maggie Smith, directed by Jonathan Kent (6 April–11 May 2019)
 A Midsummer Night’s Dream by William Shakespeare, directed by Nicholas Hytner (3 June–31 August 2019)
 Two Ladies – a new play by Nancy Harris, starring Zoë Wanamaker and Zrinka Cvitešić, directed by Nicholas Hytner (14 September–26 October 2019)
 The Lion, the Witch and the Wardrobe, based upon a previously production at the Leeds Playhouse, directed by Sally Cookson, devised by the company (9 November 2019 – 2 February 2020)
 A Number – by Caryl Churchill, starring Roger Allam and Colin Morgan, directed by Polly Findlay (14 February-14 March 2020)
 Beat the Devil – by David Hare, starring Ralph Fiennes, directed by Nicholas Hytner (27 August-7 November 2020)
 Talking Heads – by Alan Bennett (monologues performed by Monica Dolan, Lesley Manville, Rochenda Sandall, Kristin Scott Thomas, Tamsin Greig, Maxine Peake, Lucian Msamati and Imelda Staunton) (28 September-31 October 2020)
 Bach and Sons – a new play by Nina Raine, starring Simon Russell Beale, directed by Nicholas Hytner (23 June-11 September 2021)
 White Noise – by Suzan-Lori Parks, directed by Polly Findlay (5 October-13 November 2021)
 La Belle Sauvage – by Philip Pullman, adapted by Bryony Lavery, directed by Nicholas Hytner (2 December 2021 – 26 February 2022)
 Straight Line Crazy – a new play by David Hare, starring Ralph Fiennes, directed by Nicholas Hytner (14 March-18 June 2022)
 The Southbury Child – a new play by Stephen Beresford, starring Alex Jennings, directed by Nicholas Hytner (1 July-27 August 2022)
 John Gabriel Borkman – by Henrik Ibsen, a new version by Lucinda Coxon, starring Simon Russell Beale, directed by Nicholas Hytner (24 September-26 November 2022)

Future productions
Future projects include:
 Guys and Dolls – music and lyrics by Frank Loesser and book by Jo Swerling and Abe Burrows based on the story and characters by Damon Runyon, directed by Nicholas Hytner (27 February-3 September 2023)

Productions that closed early or were postponed due to COVID-19:
 I Remember It Well – Dame Judi Dench In Conversation with Gyles Brandreth 
 They Shoot Horses, Don't They? – based on the novel by Horace McCoy, adapted by Paula Vogel, directed by Marianne Elliott and Steven Hoggett
 A Christmas Carol – by Charles Dickens, starring Simon Russell Beale, Patsy Ferran and Eben Figueiredo, adapted and directed by Nicholas Hytner

References

Theatres in the London Borough of Southwark
2017 establishments in England
Producing house theatres in London
Theatres completed in 2017